Kattaka Kayal (Malayalam: കട്ടക കായല്‍) or Kattakayal is a freshwater lake in Kollam city in the Kerala state of India. The lake connects Vattakayal, a  freshwater lake in Maruthadi, with Ashtamudi Lake in the city.

History
Kattak Kayal is a part of Ashtamudi Lake and Vattakayal in Kollam. Its width was  before 50 years. Three boat jetties were there along the course of Kattaka Kayal then and huge cargo vessels berthing for loading and unloading seafood items were a common view of Quilon city those days. It was home for more than 20 species of edible fish including Karimeen and Poomeen.

Revival Program
A revival program for Vattakayal and Kattaka Kayal has been launched at Kollam on 1 November 2016 by V. Rajendrababu, Mayor of Kollam Municipal Corporation. Kattakayal Punarjeevana Padhadi is an initiative of the Shakthikulangara-based cultural organisation Sagara Samskarika Sangham. The main aim of this program is to revive both the lakes through various phases that includes cleaning of the lake and awareness campaigns.

See also
 Kollam
 Sakthikulangara
 Ashtamudi Lake
 Maruthadi

References

Tourist attractions in Kollam
Lakes of Kollam
Lakes in Kollam